BRFC may refer to:

Angling
 British Record (Rod Caught) Fish Committee

Association football
Professional clubs:
 Berwick Rangers F.C.
 Blackburn Rovers F.C.
 Brisbane Roar FC
 Bristol Rovers F.C.

Other clubs:
 Barton Rovers F.C.
 Bridon Ropes F.C.
 Brightlingsea Regent F.C.
 Brimsdown Rovers F.C.
 Bromsgrove Rovers F.C.
 Brora Rangers F.C.
 Burnham Ramblers F.C.

Rugby union

In Wales: 
Baglan RFC
Bala RFC
Bangor RFC
Banwen RFC
Bargoed RFC
Barry RFC
Beddau RFC
Bedlinog RFC
Bedwas RFC
Bethesda RFC
Bettws RFC
Betws RFC
Birchgrove RFC
Blackwood RFC
Blaenavon RFC
Blaina RFC
Bonymaen RFC
Brecon RFC
Bryncethin RFC
Bryncoch RFC
Brynithel RFC
Brynmawr RFC

In England:
Barking Rugby Football Club
Barnes Rugby Football Club
Barnstaple RFC
Basingstoke R.F.C.
Beckenham Rugby Football Club
Berwick RFC
Billericay Rugby Football Club
Birstall RFC
Blaydon RFC
Boston RFC (England)
Bournville RFC
Bracknell RFC
Bromsgrove RFC
Burton RFC

In Ireland:
Balbriggan RFC
Ballincollig RFC
Ballymena R.F.C.
Ballynahinch RFC
Banbridge RFC
Barnhall RFC
Birr RFC
Boyne RFC
Bruff R.F.C.

In Scotland:
Bannockburn RFC
Berwick RFC
Biggar RFC
Boroughmuir RFC

Others:
Bangalore rugby football club
Boston RFC (United States)